Honest Don's Records was a subsidiary label based in San Francisco, California, set up along with Pink & Black Records by Fat Wreck Chords to release material by bands that didn't fit within the roster at Fat.

The label ceased trading around 2003 with the Nerf Herder EP "My E.P.". Some of the bands were absorbed into the Fat roster, whilst others moved on.

Catalog
They released a number of albums, each of which would have a unique variant on the record labels name:

Bands 
 Bad Astronaut
 Big In Japan
 Chixdiggit
 Citizen Fish
 Dance Hall Crashers
 Diesel Boy
 Dogpiss
 Fluf
 Hagfish
 Inspection 12
 J Church
 Limp
 Mad Caddies
 MDC
 The Muffs
 Nerf Herder
 The Other
 The Real McKenzies
 The Riverdales
 Squirtgun
 Submissives
 Teen Idols

See also 
 List of record labels

Record labels disestablished in 2003
Punk record labels
Ska record labels
Alternative rock record labels
Defunct record labels of the United States